Baragaon is a town and a nagar panchayat in Jhansi district  in the state of Uttar Pradesh, India.

Geography
It has an average elevation of 210 metres (692 feet).

Demographics
 India census, Baragaon had a population of 8,039. Males constitute 54% of the population and females 46%. Baragaon has an average literacy rate of 62%, higher than the national average of 59.5%; with 65% of the males and 35% of females literate. 16% of the population is under 6 years of age. The newly elected Chairman of Baragaon is Mr Dayaram Kushwaha 
son of Shri Jagannath kushwaha purv Pradhan since 1 December 2017. He succeed Mr Kalka Prasad Kushwaha.

References

Cities and towns in Jhansi district